Shaheed A. H. M. Qamaruzzaman Stadium, also known as Rajshahi Divisional Stadium is a multi-use stadium in Rajshahi, Bangladesh. The stadium is named after AHM Qumaruzzaman, who is one of the four national leader.

History
It is currently used mostly for cricket matches. The stadium has capacity for 15,000 spectators and was built in 2004.
The venue has hosted three group stage matches of 2004 Under-19 Cricket World Cup and four matches of 2010 South Asian Games.

The stadium recently got funding from the government to increase its seating capacity and make major improvements on the field. The stadium will be leased by the BPL's local franchise Rajshahi Kings to use it as the home field for the team. It is the largest stadium of Northern Bangladesh. It is also the home ground of Rajshahi division in the National Cricket League. Beside this stadium, the Clemon Cricket Academy is situated.

See also
Stadiums in Bangladesh
List of cricket grounds in Bangladesh
AHM Qumaruzzaman

References

External links
 http://content-uk.cricinfo.com/bangladesh/content/ground/56669.html Info on venue.

Cricket grounds in Bangladesh
Sport in Rajshahi